HMS Windsor was a 60-gun fourth rate ship of the line of the Royal Navy, launched at Deptford on 31 October 1695.

On 18 November 1725 she was ordered to be taken to pieces and rebuilt according to the 1719 Establishment at Deptford, and she was relaunched on 27 October 1729. On 1 November 1742 an order was made out for Windsor to be taken to pieces once more, and rebuilt at Woolwich Dockyard as a 58-gun fourth rate. Unusually, she was not reconstructed according to the establishment of dimensions in effect at the time (the 1741 proposals of the 1719 Establishment), being made  longer on the gundeck,  longer on the keel, though with the same beam and  less depth to her hold than the standard 58s, and she was relaunched on 26 February 1745.

Windsor remained in service until 1777, when she was broken up.

Notes

References

Lavery, Brian (2003) The Ship of the Line - Volume 1: The development of the battlefleet 1650-1850. Conway Maritime Press. .

Ships of the line of the Royal Navy
1690s ships